The 1900 San Jose State Spartans football team represented State Teachers College at San Jose during the 1900 college football season. The 1900 team was co-coached by three men, James Addicott, who was the first coach for the Spartans back in 1895, coach Whitemeger, and one of the most well-known coaches of his era, Fielding Yost. This trio of leadership did not allow the Spartans to repeat their record from the year before, compiling a mild 3–3–1, although for the first time all of the Spartan's games were against collegiate opponents.

Schedule

References

San Jose State
San Jose State Spartans football seasons
San Jose State Spartans football